The 1965 Virginia Cavaliers football team represented the University of Virginia during the 1965 NCAA University Division football season. The Cavaliers were led by first-year head coach George Blackburn and played their home games at Scott Stadium in Charlottesville, Virginia. They competed as members of the Atlantic Coast Conference, originally finishing in seventh, however forfeited wins by South Carolina moved Virginia up to a tie for fourth.

Schedule

References

Virginia
Virginia Cavaliers football seasons
Virginia Cavaliers football